Ullswater 'Steamers' is a boat company which provides leisure trips on Ullswater in the north-eastern part of the English Lake District. It is based in Glenridding, Cumbria. Founded in 1855, it currently operates five diesel powered vessels between four locations on the lake. The oldest boat in its fleet was launched in 1877.

History

The company was founded as the Ullswater Steam Navigation Company in 1855, and originally moved mail, workers and goods between the Greenside Mine at Glenridding and the village of Pooley Bridge at the opposite end of the lake. On 13 August 1859, the company's first purpose-built vessel, the paddle steamer Enterprise, was launched, although it subsequently sank in the lake. In 1877, the company introduced the steam powered pleasure cruiser the Lady of the Lake, and this was joined in 1889 by the Raven. Both are still in service.

In 1900 the company was renamed as the Ullswater Navigation and Transit Company. In the 1930s, the company converted its fleet of two steam powered pleasure cruisers, the Lady of the Lake and the Raven, to operate on diesel engines. In 1954 Sir Wavell Wakefield bought a controlling shareholding in Ullswater 'Steamers' to prevent the company from being wound up. The company is still in the ownership of the family of Lord Wakefield, as Sir Wavell subsequently became.

In 2001, the company started to operate sailings during the winter; it had previously only operated during the summer tourist season. Between the years of 2001 and 2010, three additional vessels were acquired by the company, these being the Lady Dorothy, Lady Wakefield and Western Belle. All three were acquired from previous salt-water service and conveyed to the lake by road. In 2015 a new jetty was opened by the company at Aira Force.

The company was affected by the series of storms (Desmond, Eva and Frank) that hit Cumbria at the end of 2015. The Lady Wakefield, moored at Pooley Bridge Pier, broke free during Desmond and was damaged by the pier, resulting in her being deliberately driven ashore to save her from sinking. The same storm destroyed the bridge at Pooley Bridge, severing connection between the village and pier. Both the pier and the ticket office at Glenridding were flooded. By Easter 2016, services had recommenced and a replacement bridge built; the Lady Wakefield was relaunched in May and docked for repairs.

Operation 
Ullswater 'Steamers' currently operates a fleet of five vessels from four jetties on Ullswater at Glenridding, Pooley Bridge, Howtown and Aira Force. Two services are operated, with the main service providing a link the length of the lake between Glenridding, Howtown and Pooley Bridge, whilst a second shorter service connects Glenridding and Aira Force. The service frequency varies depending on the time of year, up to a roughly hourly service on both routes in summer. In addition to its scheduled passenger services, the company's vessels can be hired for private functions and parties on Ullswater.

The steamer company is in common ownership with the Ravenglass and Eskdale Railway, a  minimum gauge heritage railway that operates to the western side of the Lake District. Both companies form part of the Lake District Estates group, which also owns various tourist oriented properties in the area, and is controlled by Lord Wakefield's descendants. The vessels of the fleet are maintained on a slipway located at the Waterside Campsite, one of Lake District Estates properties near Pooley Bridge.

Fleet

Gallery

References

External links

Video footage of Ullswater and the steamer fleet

Ferry companies of England
Ferry transport in England
Transport in Cumbria
Tourist attractions in Cumbria